The 1992 Scottish League Cup final was played on 25 October 1992 at Hampden Park in Glasgow and was the final of the 47th Scottish League Cup competition. The final was contested by Aberdeen and Rangers. Rangers won the match 2–1 thanks to goals from Stuart McCall and a Gary Smith own goal. The teams would play again in the 1993 Scottish Cup Final at the end of the season, with the same scoreline.

Match details

Teams

References

See also
 Aberdeen F.C.–Rangers F.C. rivalry

1992
League Cup Final
Scottish League Cup Final 1992
Scottish League Cup Final 1992
1990s in Glasgow
October 1992 sports events in the United Kingdom